Trinity Cathedral is an Episcopal Church in downtown Pittsburgh, Pennsylvania and is the cathedral for the Episcopal Diocese of Pittsburgh.

The present Gothic church was completed in 1872 on the site of a hilltop cemetery on land deeded by heirs of Pennsylvania founder William Penn to the congregation's founders. The site, centered on a terrace above the historic "point" (where the Allegheny River and the Monongahela River join to form the Ohio River) was sacred to Native Americans as a burial ground. The Trinity Churchyard has the oldest marked graves west of the Atlantic Seaboard, of both Native American leaders, French, English, and American colonists.

1780s Round Church
The first Trinity Church was built two blocks to the west of this burial ground at the base of the hill or terrace initially.  It was constructed from the 1780s to 1805. This first church was a brick building, octagonal in shape in the meeting-house style of architecture. It was known as “The Round Church.” It was situated on a sort of triangular lot with streets on each of the three sides, so that enlargement was out of the question."

1824 Cathedral
In 1824, Trinity moved to its current site in the middle of the terrace churchyard with what is regarded as the first Gothic structure in Western Pennsylvania. John Henry Hopkins was the architect for the new building. He designed it to seat a thousand people. Hopkins' plans were adopted by the Vestry without alteration. On May 1, the feast of S. Philip and S. James, the corner-stone was laid. The building was "brick, roughcast on the outside." The Church was wide, with galleries on three sides, supported by slender cluster. The ceiling was "painted in imitation fan-vaulting." The growing congregation built St. Peter as a chapel of ease. However, in 1869 the growing congregation erected a new structure.

Current Cathedral
The cathedral was designed by architect Gordon W. Lloyd in 1870–71 with an exterior featuring English Gothic Style that was favored by mid-Victorian Episcopalians including a single central steeple and side transepts. The interior features a tall nave flanked by aisles and lit by clerestory windows. The nave walls are supported by clustered stone columns, and the austere interior ornamentation, in which the pointed arch predominates, is reminiscent of the work of the American Gothicist Richard Upjohn. Some of the stained glass windows in the nave were destroyed in a fire in 1967, and were replaced by new ones in a medieval style. All other windows date from 1872. The carved stone pulpit was built in 1922 to the design of the renowned American architect Bertram G. Goodhue.

In 2007, the cathedral exterior was cleaned for the first time in preparation for the Episcopal Diocese of Pittsburgh's 250th anniversary. The cleaning removed remnants of industrial soot dating to Pittsburgh's steel making days. The grime was causing  acid runoff to deteriorate the exterior stonework.

Anglican Realignment
In preparation for the October 2008 schism, the Cathedral Chapter adopted a special resolution on July 24, 2008. It stated the Cathedral Chapter's intention "...neither to withdraw from The Episcopal Church nor to withdraw from a realigned Diocese of Pittsburgh." Over the next three years, the cathedral continued to be led by the Rev. Dr. Catherine Brall as Canon Provost and included elected representatives from both the continuing and breakaway dioceses and the cathedral's lay delegate had voice and vote in both the Episcopal and realigned Anglican diocesan conventions. The arrangement was terminated on December 15, 2011, when the Cathedral Chapter voted to reaffirm its original 1928 articles of incorporation which specified that Trinity Cathedral was an Episcopal congregation.

In June 2015, Bishop Dorsey W. M. McConnell restored Trinity Cathedral to the center of diocesan life by relocating diocesan offices to the downtown cathedral from the suburb of Monroeville. During the tumultuous realignment, diocesan offices had been located in the Oliver Building between 1999-2009 and the Jonnet Building in Monroeville from 2009 to 2015.

See also
 List of cathedrals in the United States
 List of the Episcopal cathedrals of the United States

References

Further reading
Harriss, Helen L. (1999). Trinity & Pittsburgh: The History of Trinity Cathedral. Pittsburgh, Pennsylvania: Trinity Cathedral. x + 214 pp. + 12 pp. of color photographs.

External links
 
 City of Pittsburgh Trinity Church website
 Pittsburgh Post-Gazette article on the graveyard and cathedral
 Graveyard's history

19th-century Episcopal church buildings
cathedrals in Pittsburgh
cemeteries in Pittsburgh
churches completed in 1872
churches in Pittsburgh
Episcopal cathedrals in Pennsylvania